Tomb of Khan-e-Jahan Bahadur Kokaltash is a 17th-century tomb of a Mughal governor that is located in Mohalla Ganj, in the Pakistani city of Lahore.

History 
Khan-e-Jahan Bahadur Zafar Jung Kokaltash served as Mughal Sūbehdar (governor) of Lahore from 11 April 1691 – 1693. In mid of 1693, Emperor Aurangzeb Alamgir dismissed him from this office. Four years later, Khan-e-Jahan died on 23 November 1697 in Lahore and buried the location of this tomb.

Historic evidences are obscure about Khan-e-Jahan. Historians have different views about that who is buried here. Historian Kanhaiya Lal give remarks that he was a Vizier and Umrā-ul-Umrā during the reign of Mughal Emperor Akbar and he died in 1602. But in later Mughal History, we can find who is buried here?. He was a great noble-man, named Khan-e-Jahan Bahadur Zafar Jung Kokaltash, during the reign of Mughal Emperor Aurangzeb. Mostly historians disagree from Kanhaiya Lal's historic remark. Historian Noor Ahmed Chishti have not written any view about Khan-e-Jahan Bahadur in his "Tehqeeqt-e-Chishti", but only wrote about tomb's structure.

The grave of Khan-e-Jahan was demolished in Ranjit Singh's Era. When the Sikh Empire collapsed in 1849, and construction of Lahore Cantonment  was in underway, Some English chiefs converted this tomb into Dancing House. It is one of the last tomb, who built in the late era of Aurangzeb.

Structure 
The tomb was built in 1697–1698, After the death of Khan-e-Jahan. But certain years of construction are unknown. It is built on an octagonal platform by bricks and marble. The tomb is composed in octagon shape of architecture.

The grave was adorned with marble. In the early British India period, grave was demolished, when the construction of Mian-Mir Cantonment was in underway.  The tomb has two-storey building, can reach to upper building via stairs.

Conservation
The mausoleum is protected under the Punjab Special Premises Act of 1975. The present appearance is much denuded. In Indo-Pakistani War of 1965, most of southern and eastern facade collapsed. The dome is now supported by a brick-pillar of modern design. The Kalib-Kari (Muqarnas) of upper storey is also damaged.

Gallery

See also 
 Tomb of Anarkali
 Tomb of Ali Mardan Khan
 Tomb of Asif Khan

References 

Mausoleums in Punjab, Pakistan
Architecture of Lahore
Buildings and structures completed in the 17th century
Mughal tombs
Mughal gardens in Pakistan
Tombs in Lahore